The 1994 ISF Women's World Championship for softball was held July 29-August 7, 1994, in St. John's, Newfoundland.  The United States won its third consecutive title with a 6-0 victory over China.  The event had 28 participating countries, the largest amount in the event's history. The first five teams qualified for the Olympics, USA as host.

Pool Play

Group A

Group B

Group C

Group D

Playoffs

Round One

Japan and Netherlands Eliminated.

Round Two

Chinese Taipei and New Zealand Eliminated.

Round Three

5th place playoff

Medal Round

External links
 Dossier

Women's Softball World Championship
Isf Women's World Championship, 1994
Isf Women's World Championship, 1994
S
Sports competitions in Newfoundland and Labrador
July 1994 sports events in Canada
August 1994 sports events in Canada
Sport in St. John's, Newfoundland and Labrador
1994 in Newfoundland and Labrador